Georges Azéma (died May 9, 1864) was a French historian from Réunion.  Son of the writer Étienne Azéma and brother to the doctor Mazaé Azéma, his son Henri was also a doctor; his grandfather Jean-Baptiste Azéma had briefly served as governor of Réunion; other relatives include the poet Jean-Henri Azéma and the historian Jean-Pierre Azéma.

References
Le dictionnaire biographique de La Réunion, Sabine Deglise, Brigitte Hock-Koon, Raymonde Kissel, Michel Verguin et Mario Serviable, 1998.

1864 deaths
19th-century French historians
Writers from Réunion
Year of birth unknown
People of French descent from Réunion
French male writers